The 2021–22 FA Women's National League was the 30th season of the competition, and the fourth since a restructure and rebranding of the top four tiers of English football by The Football Association. Starting in 1991, it was previously known as the FA Women's Premier League. It sits at the third and fourth levels of the women's football pyramid, below the FA Women's Championship and above the eight regional football leagues.

The league featured six regional divisions: the Northern and Southern Premier divisions at level three of the pyramid, and Division One North, Division One Midlands, Division One South East, and Division One South West at the fourth level. The league consisted of 76 teams, divided into six divisions of 13 teams apart from the Southern Premier Division which contains 14 teams, Division One North which contains 12 teams, and Division One South West which contains 11 teams. At the end of the season the winners of the Northern and Southern Premier divisions qualified for a play-off match to decide the overall National League champion. Southampton F.C. beat Wolverhampton Wanderers in the final and were promoted to the FA Women's Championship.

Premier Division

Northern Division 
Changes from last season:

 Following the second consecutive curtailment of the season amid the COVID-19 pandemic in March 2021, it was decided that upward club movement within the women's football pyramid would be done via application. All clubs from tiers 3 to 6 were eligible to apply to move into the league immediately one tier above where they currently played with applications marked against a criterion weighted 75% on-field and 25% off-field.
 Sunderland were promoted to FA Women's Championship via application.
 Brighouse Town were promoted from Division One North via application.
 Wolverhampton Wanderers were promoted from Division One Midlands via application.
 Loughborough Foxes merged with Loughborough University's performance team to become Loughborough Lightning.

League table

Results

Southern Division 
Changes from last season:

 Following the second consecutive curtailment of the season amid the COVID-19 pandemic in March 2021, it was decided that upward club movement within the women's football pyramid would be done via application. All clubs from tiers 3 to 6 were eligible to apply to move into the league immediately one tier above where they currently played with applications marked against a criterion weighted 75% on-field and 25% off-field.
 Watford were promoted to FA Women's Championship via application.
 London Bees were relegated from FA Women's Championship on sporting merit.
 Ipswich Town were promoted from Division One South East via application.
 Southampton F.C. were promoted from Division One South West via application.
 Yeovil United became Bridgwater United W.F.C. after merging with men's club Bridgwater Town.

League table

Results

Championship play-off
The overall FA WNL champion was decided by a play-off match held at the end of the season between the Northern Division and Southern Division winners. The play-off match winner also earned promotion to the FA Women's Championship subject to meeting licensing requirements. The game was broadcast live on BBC iPlayer and the BBC Sport website.

Division One

Division One North 
Changes from last season:

 Following the second consecutive curtailment of the season amid the COVID-19 pandemic in March 2021, it was decided that upward club movement within the women's football pyramid would be done via application. All clubs from tiers 3 to 6 were eligible to apply to move into the league immediately one tier above where they currently played with applications marked against a criterion weighted 75% on-field and 25% off-field.
 Brighouse Town were promoted to Northern Premier Division via application.
 Alnwick Town were promoted from North East Regional Women's Football League via application.
 F.C. United of Manchester were promoted from North West Women's Regional Football League via application.
 Bolton Ladies folded and withdrew from the league prior to the start of the 2021–22 season.

League table

Division One Midlands 
Changes from last season:

 Following the second consecutive curtailment of the season amid the COVID-19 pandemic in March 2021, it was decided that upward club movement within the women's football pyramid would be done via application. All clubs from tiers 3 to 6 were eligible to apply to move into the league immediately one tier above where they currently played with applications marked against a criterion weighted 75% on-field and 25% off-field.
 Wolverhampton Wanderers were promoted to Northern Premier Division via application.
 Leek Town were promoted from West Midlands Regional Women's Football League via application.
 Peterborough United were promoted from East Midlands Regional Women's Football League via application.
 Holwell Sports folded on 3 January 2022 and their results were removed from the league table.

League table

Division One South East 
Changes from last season:

 Following the second consecutive curtailment of the season amid the COVID-19 pandemic in March 2021, it was decided that upward club movement within the women's football pyramid would be done via application. All clubs from tiers 3 to 6 were eligible to apply to move into the league immediately one tier above where they currently played with applications marked against a criterion weighted 75% on-field and 25% off-field.
 Ipswich Town were promoted to Southern Premier Division via application.
 Harlow Town were promoted from Eastern Region Women's Football League via application.
 Queens Park Rangers were promoted from London and South East Women's Regional Football League via application.
 Leyton Orient were rebranded London Seaward after Leyton Orient severed ties with the club.

League table

Division One South West 
Changes from last season:

 Following the second consecutive curtailment of the season amid the COVID-19 pandemic in March 2021, it was decided that upward club movement within the women's football pyramid would be done via application. All clubs from tiers 3 to 6 were eligible to apply to move into the league immediately one tier above where they currently played with applications marked against a criterion weighted 75% on-field and 25% off-field.
 Southampton F.C. were promoted to Southern Premier Division via application.
 Brislington took voluntary relegation to South West Regional Women's Football League.
 Bournemouth were promoted from Southern Region Women's Football League via application.
 Portishead Town were promoted from South West Regional Women's Football League via application.
 Buckland Athletic withdrew from the league on 7 December 2021 and their results were removed from the league table.

League table

See also
2021–22 FA Women's National League Cup
2021–22 FA Women's National League Plate
2021–22 FA WSL (tier 1)
2021–22 FA Women's Championship (tier 2)

References

External links 
 Official website of the FA Women's National League

FA Women's National League seasons
2021–22 in English women's football
FA Women's National League